Any Day Now (aka Vandaag of morgen) is a 1976 science fiction film directed by Roeland Kerbosch and starring Ansje van Brandenberg.

Plot
The film features a dystopian near-future world which has been split into three. The Third World are the owners of all of the world's resources and are now able to hold the United States and Europe to ransom.

Cast
 Ansje van Brandenberg
 Huib Broos
 Ton van Duinhoven
 Wim de Haas
 Piet Hendriks
 Ben Hulsman
 Michiel Kerbosch
 Gees Linnebank
 Barbara Masbeck
 Georgette Reyevski
 Coby Stunnenberg
 Bernard Martens van Vliet
 Frans Vorstman

References 

 Wingrove, David. Science Fiction Film Source Book (Longman Group Limited, 1985)

External links 
 

1976 films
1970s dystopian films
1970s science fiction films
1970s Dutch-language films
Films set in the future
Dutch science fiction films